Category F5 is the seventh studio album by American rapper Twista. The album marks the first collaboration with Chicago producer the Legendary Traxster since 2004's Kamikaze. The album was released on July 14, 2009. Originally scheduled to feature Kanye West, Akon, Busta Rhymes, Mr. Criminal, Tech N9ne, and Static Major, guest appearances were pared down as many of the recorded songs were leaked, including the song "Problems" featuring Tech N9ne, which was cut because of sample-clearance problems. The track "She Got It" (produced by Jim Jonsin & featuring Bobby Valentino) was cut because the tracks were not 100% ready. "All Right" (produced by Kanye West) was included on iTunes as a bonus track.

Track listing 

Notes
 "Birthday" features additional vocals performed by Marlin "Hookman" Bonds.

Personnel

Artists
 Twista – primary artist (all tracks)
 Buk – featured artist (track 1)
 Lil Boosie – featured artist (track 3)
 R. Kelly – featured artist (track 5)
 Gucci Mane – featured artist (track 6)
 OJ da Juiceman – featured artist (track 6)
 Erika Shevon – featured artist (track 7)
 Busta Rhymes – featured artist (track 8)
 Do or Die – featured artist (track 9)
 N.A.R.D. – featured artist (track 9)
 AK – featured artist (track 9)
 Johnny P – featured artist (track 9)
 Static Major – featured artist (track 11)
 Akon – featured artist (track 12)
 Liffy Stokes – featured artist (track 14)
 Marlin "Hookman" Bonds – background artist (track 15)
Technical personnel
 The Legendary Traxster – mastering (all tracks), mixing (tracks 1–3, 5–15), recording (1, 3, 5, 7, 9, 11)
 Team Shells - Boi Beatz mixing <small>(tracks 3, 5–8)
 Matt Hennessy – mastering
 Jon Spurgeon – recording (tracks 2, 4, 6, 8, 10–15), mixing (track 4)
 Toxic – recording (track 2, 14)
 R. Kelly – recording (track 5)

Record producers
 The Legendary Traxster – production (tracks 1, 3, 5, 7, 9, 11)
 John Grant – production (track 2)
 Team Shells  – production Boi Beatz (tracks 5, 8, 17)
 Toxic – production (tracks 2, 14)
 Solo – production (track 4)
 Tight Mike – production (track 4)
 Zaytoven – production (track 6)
 Caution & Velly – production (track 8)
 Streetrunner – production (track 10)
 I.L.O. – production (track 10)
 GoodWill & MGI – production (track 12)
 Chad Beatz – production (track 13)
 Marlin "Hookman" Bonds – production (track 15)
 Curtis Kincade – guitar (tracks 7, 11)
Additional personnel
 Carl Mitchell – executive producer
 Rawle Stewart – executive producer

References 

2009 albums
Albums produced by Kanye West
Albums produced by No I.D.
Albums produced by Zaytoven
EMI Records albums
Twista albums
Albums produced by The Legendary Traxster